Jehan Mubarak (born 10 January 1981) is an American-born former professional Sri Lankan cricketer, who played all formats of the game. He is a left-handed batsman and a right-arm offbreak bowler.

Personal life

The son of Azeez Mohamed Mubarak, a first-class cricketer himself and later a prominent scientist, Mubarak was born in Washington, D.C., making him, with West Indian Ken Weekes, one of only two Test cricketers born in the United States. His family soon returned to Sri Lanka, however, where he was educated at Royal College Colombo, winning the coveted Royal Crown for cricket and colours in water polo. He holds a degree in Physical Science from University of Colombo. Mubarak was initially spotted at a Cricket training camp in Dambulla by former players Arjuna Ranatunga and Aravinda de Silva, and subsequently labeled one of the brightest future stars of Sri Lankan cricket,.

Mubarak started his sporting career as a swimmer and then became a cricketer. He swam for Royal College and  competed at National Level swimming competitions by representing his alma-mater. Mubarak specialized in short-distance swimming and won the national championship in 50 meter butterfly stroke. In 2006–2007 Jehan swam for Sri Lanka National Swimming meet and after finishing his semi-final heat he opt out from final event to participate in Sri Lanka national cricket team practice. Mubarak also led the Royal College Water Polo team during his time at Royal College.

Mubarak was involved in an accident on 22 April 2012 while driving back from Wilpattu National Park; he was arrested and later acquitted as the result of a head-on collision which killed a motorcyclist.

Domestic career
After being a prolific run scorer in school yard cricket, though only playing a handful of first class games, Mubarak was eliciting comparisons to West Indian cricket icon Brian Lara for not only his graceful batting style but also for his ability against spinners. He made his Twenty20 debut on 17 August 2004, for Colombo Cricket Club in the 2004 SLC Twenty20 Tournament.

In July 2009, Mubarak was selected to captain the Sri Lanka Board XI against India. In August 2009, he scored 160 for Sri Lanka A against Pakistan A  and in September 2009 he captained and guided Sri Lankan domestic champions Wayamba to the Champions League in India.

International career

Debut

In July 2002 he made his Test debut against Bangladesh, and in November 2002 he made his ODI debut against South Africa and participated in the 2003 World Cup hosted by South Africa.

After his debut Ranjit Fernando stated on air that Mubarak's batting was "poetry in motion" and that he should be given more responsibility in order to improve the professionalism of the Sri Lankan cricket team.

Decline

In June 2005 however, three years after his debut he had failed to live up to initial expectations and was looked over for selection and has been given limited opportunities since.

In February 2006, he was fined after showing dissent towards an umpire in an ODI against Bangladesh

Re-emergence

In August 2007 he was rushed into the Sri Lankan Twenty20 squad following the departures of Marvan Atapattu and Russel Arnold, following man-of-the-match performances against Bangladesh. He performed admirably during this tournament which included a 13-ball 46 against Kenya, where the team recorded highest ever twenty20 international team total by posting 260/6, which stood for 9 years until Australia beat the record.

In September 2007 Mubarak subsequently re-called back into the ODI squad and Sri Lankan Test team against England.

In September 2008 Mubarak performed well all-round against Hong-Kong playing for the Sri Lankan Development XI.

In May 2009 Mubarak was selected as one of the overseas players of Brothers Union Chittagong for their campaign in the Habib Group Port City Cricket League (PCL) tournament being held in Chittagong, Bangladesh between 2 and 10 May 2009.

Late career

Many commentators remarked that he had previously been treated unfairly and never given an extended run in the Sri Lankan team, and this along with the enormous burden placed on him in his youth was the main reason behind his lack of consistency. Cricket loving public feels he has been given more opportunities than others as he is from the same school as the Chief selector Asantha De Mel. Asantha De Mel was replaced by Aravinda De Silva in 2010.

Mubarak has also been touted as a future captain of Sri Lanka due to his handling of his team Wayamba and of the media during the Champions League in India.

In 2015, he is slated for a test recall for his fielding abilities by Jonty Rhodes due to his long reach. Mubarak played his first test after 8 years due to back to back thousand runs in domestic seasons. He played third test in Pakistan series for Sangakkara's place and made good contribution in batting with skipper Angelo Mathews in the second innings. But, Sri Lanka couldn't win the match and lost it by 6 wickets.

National records 
Jehan Mubarak has the highest ever strike rate (353.84) in a T20I match for Sri Lanka, set when he made 46 not out off 13 balls against Kenya in the 2007 World T20.

Commentator 
Jehan Mubarak made his commentary debut during the test series between Sri Lanka and Bangladesh.

See also
 List of Test cricketers born in non-Test playing nations

References

External links 
 

Sri Lankan cricketers
1981 births
Living people
Sri Lanka Test cricketers
Sri Lanka One Day International cricketers
Cricketers at the 2003 Cricket World Cup
Sri Lanka Twenty20 International cricketers
Cricketers at the 2010 Asian Games
Alumni of Royal College, Colombo
Alumni of the University of Colombo
Khulna Tigers cricketers
Colombo Cricket Club cricketers
Wayamba cricketers
Kandurata cricketers
Sri Lankan Muslims
Sportspeople from Washington, D.C.
Hambantota Troopers cricketers
Southern Express cricketers
Asian Games competitors for Sri Lanka
Uthura Rudras cricketers